Mid-State Correctional Facility is located in the Town of Marcy, between the cities of Rome and Utica in New York State.   From about 1912 through 1982 the state ran a state asylum on these grounds.  That institution would grow to hold 3,000 patients.  Mid-State opened as a correctional institution, in the extensive former hospital buildings, in 1983.   

Mid-State has grown and now includes maximum security SHU-200, opened in 1998.  These blocks are called "S" blocks, and consist of prisoners living in cells with bunk beds. These prisoners are let out into their porches for several hours, numerous times throughout every day. The place where they are allowed to go outside mimics their room except that it is outside, and surrounded by a fence. Even though Mid-State has a maximum security building it is still classified as a medium security prison. Mid-State cleared the way for its neighbor, Marcy Correctional Facility, located across the street, and two others, the Oneida Correctional Facility, closed about 2011, and Mohawk Correctional Facility.

Phase One
During the first phase of the prison, Mid-State shared its place with a hospital that took care of the criminally insane. The hospital was known as the Central New York Psychiatric Center.

Phase Two 
The second phase took place in 1986. This increased the size of the site that the hospital and Mid-State had to share. Eventually the whole site was left to Mid-State and the Central New York Psychiatric Center. Since 1983 there have not been any escapes or other troublesome incidents.

Notable prisoners
Gerald Garson, former New York Supreme Court Justice, convicted of accepting bribes
Chinx Drugz, hip-hop artist
Cormega, hip-hop artist
Prodigy, hip-hop artist
Dennis Kozlowski, former CEO of Tyco International
Alan Hevesi, former Comptroller of the State of New York, convicted of taking bribes in return for investing in firms for the New York State Retirement Fund
Jeffrey Atkins (Ja Rule), rapper and actor that has sold over 40 million records worldwide. In July 2007, Ja Rule was arrested for gun and drug possession charges.

Footnotes

References 
1. New York State Department of Correctional Services. Retrieved October 9, 2006, from
https://web.archive.org/web/20060824182749/http://www.docs.state.ny.us/

Prisons in New York (state)
Buildings and structures in Oneida County, New York
1983 establishments in New York (state)